The New Zealand Dance Company (incorporated as The New Zealand Dance Advancement Trust) is an Auckland based, nationally focused contemporary dance company.

Established in 2012, by co-founders Chief Executive/Artistic Director (and Arts Laureate) Shona McCullagh and the founding General Manager Frances Turner, the company sought to break the paradigm of dance companies operating on a project by project basis, presenting work by one choreographer, and moved instead to a sustainable model of presenting a variety of choreographic works.

About 

The New Zealand Dance Company (NZDC) was begun in 2021 by former Limbs Dance Company member Shona McCullagh. Like Limbs, the NZDC company commissions work from New Zealand and international choreographers. Part of the mission was to support new talent and utilise dancers and choreographers who had left New Zealand. The founding production was the Language of Living, featuring choreographers Michael Parmenter, Justin Haiu, Sarah Foster-Sproull and Shona McCullagh.

NZDC has developed more than 25 new works by choreographers from New Zealand, Australia, Holland and South Korea and has toured internationally including to the Holland Dance Festival, Australia, Germany, Liverpool, France, Belgium, Luxembourg and Canada.

In addition to a professional Company, NZDC has a Youth and Community Engagement Programme of weekly classes, masterclasses and workshops for all ages and levels – including an over 60s Feisty Feet class.

In 2011 Creative New Zealand funded the new venture of The New Zealand Dance Company and Westpac bank sponsored.

Dancers 

 Carl Tolentino
 Chrissy Kokiri
 Katie Rudd
 Ngaere Jenkins

Management 

 Interim Chief Executive - Caroline Bindon 
 Artistic Director - Tor Colombus
 Creative Producer & Marketing Lead - JP Bolton
 Finance Manager - Christine Rice

Works 

ArteFact (2022)
 Location - New Zealand Tour 2022
 Director/ Choreographer - Ross McCormack

Night Light (2022)
 Location - ASB Waterfront Theatre, Auckland
 Choreographers - Tor Colombus and Eddie Elliott 
 
This Fragile Planet (2020)
Location - Auckland Fringe Festival and Hamilton Gardens Arts Festival
 Choreographers - Nina Nawalowalo and Tom McCrory (The Conch), Ross McCormack

 International Tours (2019, 2018, 2016, 2015, 2014)
 Location - Canada, Belgium, Luxemburg, Paris, Liverpool, Germany, Holland, Australia, Netherlands

 Matariki for Tamariki (2019, 2020, 2022)
 Location - Auckland, Northland
 Choreographer - Sean McDonald

 Kiss the Sky (2019, 2017)
 Location - Bay of Islands, Wanaka, Invercargill, Wellington, New Plymouth, Nelson, Hamilton, Auckland
 Choreographers - KIM Jae Duk, Victoria Columbus, Stephanie Lake, Sue Healey

 Tamaki Tour
 Location - Auckland
 Choreographers - Sean McDonald, Mia Mason, Lucy Marinkovich, Chrissy Kokiri, Taniora Motutere, Ashleigh Perriot, Tupua Tigafua, Bianca Hyslop, Scott Ewen, Omea Geary, Malia Johnston, Joshua Cesan

 Lumina (2018, 2016 ,2015)
 Location - Paris, Liverpool, Hamilton, Christchurch, Nelson, Auckland, Germany, Holland, Whangarei, Napier, Wellington, New Plymouth
 Choreographers - Stephen Shropshire, Louise Potiki Bryant, Malia Johnston

 OrphEus - A Dance Opera (2018)
 Location - Auckland Festival, New Zealand Festival Wellington
 Choreographer - Michael Parmenter

 The Absurdity of Humanity (2017, 2016)
 Location - New Plymouth, Marlborough, Christchurch, Wellington, Auckland

 Rotunda (2015, 2014, 2013)
 Location - Tauranga, Wellington, Christchurch, Dunedin, Auckland, Adelaide, Melbourne, Parramatta, Geelong, Den Haag, Amsterdam, Auckland
 Choreographer - Shona McCullagh in collaboration with dancers

 Language of Living (2014, 2013, 2012)
 Location - Invercargill, Christchurch, Nelson, New Plymouth, Tauranga, Auckland, Whangarei, Hawke's Bay, Wellington
 Choreographers - Shona McCullagh, Michael Parmenter, Sarah Foster-Sproull, Justin Haiu, Tupua Tigafua, Anne Teresa De Keersmaeker

 Shaun Parker's Trolleys
 Winner of the Argus Angel Award (Brighton Festival, UK)
 Location - UK, Spain, Belgium, France, Malaysia, the Netherlands, Australia, Auckland
 Choreographer - Shaun Parker

References

External links 
 The New Zealand Dance Company

Organizations established in 2011
Dance companies in New Zealand
Arts in New Zealand
Organisations based in Auckland
Performing groups established in 2011